Pedro Luis Joao Figueira Álvarez (born 18 June 1998), known as La Divaza, is a Venezuelan YouTuber and singer. La Divaza is the second YouTuber from Venezuela to reach one million subscribers after Dross.

Biography
He was born in the city of Maracay, Aragua, Venezuela, and studied at "Instituto Escuela Maracay" in which graduated in 2015. He began producing videos on YouTube at the end of 2012, where he described the situation in his home country. His character, "La Divaza" caused controversy nationally and internationally for the peculiar personality it presented and the content of his videos. To this day he has become an icon and a phenomenon on social media.

In 2011, Divaza (Pedro for his family and friends) began making videos of the social networking site Habbo, but stopped in 2012 when his channel called La Divaza flourished.

"La Divaza" is Pedro Luis alter ego. "A diva." It is a varied channel as far as content is concerned, ranging from vlogs, gameplays and reviews to annual awards like the VMAs, AMAs, EMAs, Billboards, Miss Universe and the Grammys, to more serious topics of social awareness.

His best friend, Jose Gregorio Santos (also known as La Jose) who lives with him in Mexico City. He has made several appearances in his channel when he lived in Venezuela with the YouTuber Konrad Montero (also known as La Konrad) but because of the distance, only contact via social networks.

He is currently touring and performing for his millions of fans throughout the world and he has collaborated with many famous YouTubers such as Mariale, Alejo Igoa, Kimberly Loaiza and Juan Pablo Jaramillo. He got actually nine million of subscribers in YouTube.

In December 2017, he released a song as a part of a viral YouTube challenge called "Roast Yourself" (like the challenge itself) that was accompanied by a music video, promoting her alter-ego. One week later, the song was available on iTunes, reaching the top on Mexico and others Latin American countries. The music video got one million likes in 24 hours and more than six millions views on YouTube. As of June 2020, the music video had 115 million views and 3,5 million likes, making it the most successful song ever by a YouTuber. He performed the song live at the 2018 MTV Millennial Awards, where he hosted the show alongside Chilean singer Mon Laferte, in which he won two awards, there are: MIAW Icon of the Year and Roasted of the Year.

In 15 November 2019, he released his first song called "Cachete Al Suelo" under the music label Warner Music Group.

In 2020 he made a challenge video called "Sing the song" with Colombian singer Karol G.

In 28 December 2020 he launched his new song called "D.I.V.A."

In 2022 he launched other new song called "La Noche". 

In 2023 integrate the new season of the reality "La Venganza De Los Ex", launched in the channel MTV Latinoamerica and the platform of streaming Paramount Plus.

Actually he had a second channel in YouTube called "Keeping Up With La Divaza", where he brodcasts the podcast called "Radio Divaza", made with his best friend and influencer José Gregorio Santos "La Jose". This podcast can found in Spotify.

Filmography

TV

Awards and nominations

References

Living people
Spanish-language YouTubers
Venezuelan YouTubers
Venezuelan people of Portuguese descent
LGBT YouTubers
Bisexual men
Bisexual singers
People from Maracay
Venezuelan bisexual people
Venezuelan LGBT singers
1998 births
20th-century Venezuelan LGBT people
21st-century Venezuelan LGBT people
YouTube channels launched in 2012